Pallacanestro Virtus Roma, commonly known as Virtus Roma, was an Italian professional basketball club based in Rome, Lazio. It competed in the first division of Italian basketball, the LBA, for the last time in the 2020–21 season.

It was formerly a major side in Europe, winning the 1983–84 FIBA European Champions Cup (EuroLeague), and at one time being one of only 13 clubs to hold a EuroLeague A license. However, its standing later waned, and Virtus became less competitive in both Europe and the domestic LBA - which it had won in 1983 – before being voluntarily relegated to the Italian second division in July 2015.

In December 2020, Virtus was dissolved after the club was declared bankrupt after months of financial struggles.

For past club sponsorship names, see sponsorship names.

History
The club was formed by the merger of two Roman sides, San Saba and Gruppo Borgo Cavalleggeri, under the name Virtus Aurelia in the late 1960s, the founding date of San Saba, 1960, was kept as Virtus'. In 1972, Virtus Aurelia merged with GS Banco di Roma, the sporting wing of Banco di Roma, forming Pallacanestro Banco di Roma Virtus or simply Banco di Roma. The side reached the Italian second division in 1978, staying two years before moving up to the Italian top level LBA, in 1980.

This was the start of an extended stay in the first division, and success followed soon after, with the side winning the 1983 championship. Earning a place in the 1983–84 FIBA European Champions Cup (EuroLeague), Virtus went on to win the competition at its first try, with a Larry Wright led squad, that also had Clarence Kea, Renzo Tombolato, and Fulvio Polesello. Wright was decisive in the EuroLeague Final against FC Barcelona, scoring 27 points, as Roma overturned a 10-point halftime deficit to win the decider. The next season, the Italian club won the 1984 FIBA Intercontinental Cup, after topping a group of international clubs in Brazil. Roma also won the 1985–86 FIBA Korać Cup final against Mobilgirgi Caserta.

The club's next title was the 1991–92 FIBA Korać Cup, by which time Banco di Roma had been replaced as the club's sponsor by Il Messaggero. A squad comprising Dino Rađa, Rick Mahorn, Roberto Premier, and Andrea Niccolai downed Scavolini Pesaro in the two-legged final. The next year, Virtus managed to reach the FIBA Korać Cup final again, but lost the game against Philips Milano. During the 2002–03 season, Carlton Myers led the team to a 25–9 record in the Serie A (LBA), as Roma reached the playoff's semifinals. After adding Dejan Bodiroga as a player, and head coach Svetislav Pešić, in the 2005 off-season, Virtus reached the ULEB Cup (EuroCup) quarterfinals, the Serie A semifinals, and the Italian Cup final, that it lost in overtime.

In the summer of 2011, the Italian club's EuroLeague A-license was suspended, after it finished in the bottom half of the Serie A. The next year, it lost the license completely, after having the worst record among A license clubs. It lost its license to EA7 Emporio Armani Milano.

In a strange twist, Virtus Roma then went on to have an excellent season, unexpectedly, by their own admission, reaching the Serie A finals, which would earn it the right to return to the EuroLeague. However, the club relinquished their rights, as they did not agree to some of the competition's requirements. In particular, paying rent for an arena with the minimum arena capacity. They thus earned a place in the second tier EuroCup instead.

In July 2015, despite having satisfied the economic conditions to participate in the Italian top level LBA, the club's management asked to participate instead in the Italian second division Serie A2. The permission to do so was granted by the Italian Basketball Federation. The cited motive for the move to the lower division, was an insufficient budget to be competitive at the higher level, and the desire to restructure the club based on a youth policy.

On April 23, 2019, after beating Legnano Knights by 83–88, Virtus Roma is proclaimed champion of the Serie A2, getting the direct promotion to the Serie A. Virtu returns to the highest tier after an absence of four years.

Dissolution
On December 9, 2020, the club withdrew from the Serie A due to financial difficulties and the inability to find a new investor.

Arenas

Palazzetto dello Sport (seating capacity: 3,500): (1960–1983, 2000–2003, 2011–2018)
PalaLottomatica: (seating capacity: 11,200): (1983–1999, 2003–2011, 2018–2020)

Virtus played at the 3,500 seating capacity Palazzetto dello Sport arena, until 1983. The club then played at the  
11,200 seat PalaLottomatica arena, from 1983 to 2011, except between 2000 and 2003, when the arena was undergoing extensive renovation work.

After the club down scaled its operations costs, due to reduced funds, Virtus found the operating costs of the PalaLottomatica to be prohibitive, and decided to avoid playing in the larger arena. So from 2011 to 2018, it returned to the Palazzetto dello Sport, even playing games there during the 2013 Italian LBA Finals.

On June 9, 2018, Virtus Roma reached a new deal with All Events SpA, the operator of PalaLottomatica, to play at the arena during the Serie A2 2018–19 season.

2020–21 roster 
This was the last roster that Roma had in the 2020–21 LBA season before the official withdrawal from the championship.

The team would line up as in the shown below. Roma adopted a 6+6 format where a maximum of 6 foreign players along with 6 Italian or Italian grown players could be called for each game.

Honours

Total titles: 6

Domestic competitions
 Italian League
 Winners (1): 1982–83
 Runners-up (2): 2007–08, 2012–13
 Italian Cup
 Runners-up (2): 1989–90, 2005–06
 Italian Supercup
 Winners (1): 2000

European competitions
 EuroLeague
 Winners (1): 1983–84
 FIBA Korać Cup (defunct)
 Winners (2): 1985–86, 1991–92
 Runners-up (1): 1992–93
 Semifinalists (1): 1997–98
 European Club Super Cup (semi-official, defunct)
 Runners-up (1): 1983

Worldwide competitions
 FIBA Intercontinental Cup
 Winners (1): 1984

Other competitions
 Trofeo Ambrose
 Winners (1): 2009

The road to the European victories

1983–84 FIBA European Champions Cup

1985–86 FIBA Korać Cup

1991–92 FIBA Korać Cup

Season by season record
The following table shows the records from the season 1977–78 in all competitions:

Notable players

2010s

2000s

1990s

1980s

1970s

Head coaches

Sponsorship names
Throughout the years, due to sponsorship, the club has been known as:

Virtus Aurelia (no sponsorship, 1960–61 until 1971–72)
Banco di Roma (1972–73 until 1987–88)
Phonola Roma (1988–89)
Il Messaggero Roma (1989–90 until 1991–92)
Virtus Roma (no sponsorship, 1992–93)
Burghy Roma (1993–94)
Teorematour Roma (1994–95)
Nuova Tirrena Roma (1995–96)
Telemarket Roma (1996–97)
Calze Pompea Roma (1997–98 until 1998–99)
Aeroporti di Roma Virtus (1999–00 until 2000–01)
Würth Roma (2001–02)
Lottomatica Roma (2002–03 until 2010–11)
Acea Roma (2011–12 until 2015–16)
UniCusano Roma (2016–17 until 2017–18)
Virtus Roma (no sponsorship, 2018–19 to 2020–21)

References

External links

Serie A Historical Results  Retrieved 18 July 2015
Eurobasket.com Team Profile

1960 establishments in Italy
Basketball teams established in 1960
Basketball in Rome
Basketball teams in Lazio
EuroLeague-winning clubs
Sports clubs in Rome
Basketball teams disestablished in 2020